Wade Ward (1892–1971) was an American old-time music banjo player and fiddler from Independence, Virginia.  He was widely known playing the clawhammer banjo and frequently won the Galax, Virginia Old Time Fiddler's Convention.  His instrument, a Gibson RB-11 5-string banjo, is now in the collection of the Smithsonian Institution. Along with Kyle Creed, Wade Ward is known for his 'Galax' style of playing the clawhammer banjo.

Biography
Ward began performing in public in 1919, at age 26. His first group, the Buck Mountain Band, included Van Edwards on fiddle and Van's son Earl on guitar.  In 1925, Ward recorded four solo tunes (unreleased) for the Okeh label during a field recording session in Asheville, North Carolina.  In October 1929 he and the Buck Mountain Band recorded four more tunes for Okeh in Richmond, Virginia, two of which were released.  In the early 1930s, Ward joined a band called the Ballard Branch Bogtrotters, formed by his older brother Crockett, who was twenty years his senior. Ward played banjo, Crockett and his neighbor Alec "Uncle Eck" Dunford played fiddles, Crockett's son Fields played guitar and sang, and the Wards' family doctor W. P. Davis managed the group and occasionally played autoharp.  Folklorist John A. Lomax discovered the group in 1937 at the Galax Fiddlers' Convention and recorded them for the Library of Congress. John's son Alan Lomax recorded Wade in 1939, 1941, and again in 1959; nearly 200 recordings of Ward are archived at the Library of Congress' American Folklife Center.  Other folklorists including Mike Seeger and Peter Hoover made additional field recordings in the 1950s and 1960s.  The Bogtrotters appeared at festivals during the folk revivals of the 40s and 50s.

Despite his musical gifts, Ward made his living as a farmer. He died in 1971 in Independence, Virginia, and is buried in the Saddle Creek Primitive Baptist Church Cemetery a few miles west of town.

Discography

Many other recordings by Wade Ward have been released on compilation albums from Smithsonian Folkways, Biograph, Rounder, County and other labels.

See also
Alan Lomax
Charlie Higgins
Clawhammer
 High Atmosphere, 1975 Rounder Records compilation
Old-time music

References

Further reading

 Lornell, Kip (1989) Virginia's Blues, Country, & Gospel Records 1902-1943: An Annotated Discography. University Press of Kentucky, p. 207, .
 McGee, Marty (2000) Traditional Musicians of the Central Blue Ridge: Old Time, Early Country, Folk and Bluegrass Label Recording Artists, with Discographies. McFarland & Company, Inc., p. 180-4, .
 Russell, Tony, and Bob Pinson (2004)  Country Music Records: A Discography, 1921–1942. Oxford University Press, p. 939, .

1892 births
1971 deaths
American banjoists
Old-time musicians
Musicians from Virginia
Okeh Records artists
People from Grayson County, Virginia
Appalachian old-time fiddlers
20th-century American musicians